Paranam is a large village located in the Sendurai taluk of Ariyalur district, Tamil Nadu, India.

Demographics 
 census, Paranam had a total population of 4,844 with 2,337 males and 2,507 females.

References 

Villages in Ariyalur district